Sarah Russell may refer to:

 Sarah Rachel Russell (died 1880), cosmetician and blackmailer
 Sarah Russell, pseudonym of Marghanita Laski
 Sarah Elizabeth Russell, daughter of John Russell, 4th Earl Russell

See also 
 Sara Russell (born 1966), British planetary scientist